Åsgårdstrand is a small port town in Horten municipality, Vestfold, Norway. It is also the name of a former independent municipality and a center of trade. The town is situated 10 km south of Horten, 10 km north of Tønsberg and 100 km south of Oslo by the west coast of the Oslofjord. On 1 January 1965 Åsgårdstrand and Borre municipalities, plus a part of Sem were merged into the new municipality of Borre. By the time of the merger Åsgårdstrand had 488 inhabitants and was the smallest municipality in Norway.

Åsgårdsstrand is a summer resort destination with a number of restored old homes. It is home to various cafés, galleries, and a beach. Edvard Munch’s former home is now owned by the municipality and open to the public. It is also home to Borre Kystled, a hiking trail which leads to Borre National Park.

The name
The meaning of the name is the strand (beach, waterside) belonging to the farm Åsgård (Norse - Ásgarðr). The first element in the farm's name is´ás meaning 'mountain ridge' (the usage here referring to its position on Raet), the last element is garðr meaning 'farm'.

History

Åsgårdstrand was ladested (center of trade) from 1650 under Tønsberg, from 1660 under Holmestrand. In 1752 the center of trade was given the rights of doing business with national goods. From the beginning of the 19th century, Åsgårdstrand, was a lively export harbor for lumber, of which most was exported to the Netherlands. By the end of the sail ship era, the trade stagnated. The municipality was founded as Åsgårdstrand formannskapsdistrikt in 1837. Merchant and ship owner Anders Riddervold was elected as the first mayor.

Dating from  the 1880s, the town had been increasingly known as an important center for artists and painters. A number of internationally noted painters has either visited or lived in the town including  Edvard Munch, Christian Krogh and Hans Heyerdahl. In 1898 Edvard Munch  bought a house in Åsgårdstrand where he spent the first of many summers.  The house is now operated as a small museum which is associated with the  Vestfold Museum (Vestfoldmuseene).

Since the 1920s Åsgårdstrand has been a popular vacation and recreational spot. Visitors come to the small town each summer and spend their holidays in one of the four hotels. From 2007, the town has had the classification of a Tourist Town, which gives the shop owners in the oldest part closest to the sea the right to keep open every day of the week. In order to become a Tourist Town the number of visitors needs to greatly exceed the number of residents throughout the year. In June every year, Åsgårdstrand celebrates Midsummer - the longest day of the year - with a large fire on the shore.

Notable people from Åsgårdstrand

Hans Anton Apeness (1842–1930), lumber merchant born in Åsgårdstrand. A street in Calais has been named after him.
Einar Thorstein Diesen (1894–1962), broadcaster from Åsgårdstrand
Jahn Ekenæs (1847–1920), art painter, lived in Åsgårdstrand
Øivin Holst Grimsgaard (1900–1989), architect born in Åsgårdstrand
Hans Heyerdahl (1857–1913), art painter, lived in Åsgårdstrand
Jens Kristensen (1975–), illustrator born in Åsgårdstrand
Per Lasson Krohg (1889–1965), art painter born in Åsgårdstrand, son of Oda and Christian Krohg 
Ingerid Paulsen Kuiters (1939–), illustrator lives in Åsgårdstrand
Svein Døvle Larssen (1928–), former editor of Tønsbergs Blad bosatt i Åsgårdstrand
Edvard Munch (1863–1944), art painter with summer house in Åsgårdstrand
Ola Abrahamsson (1883–1980), art painter with summer house in Åsgårdstrand. A street in Åsgårdstrand has been named after him.
Nils Johan Semb (1959–), Norwegian national soccer team head coach, 1998–2003, living in Åsgårdstrand
Marthin Hamlet (1992-), wrestler and mixed martial artist raised in Åsgårdstrand

References

External links
Map and aerial photo of Åsgårdstrand
 Horten kommune about Åsgårdstrand
Photos from Åsgårdstrand on Flickr
ScenicNorway, photos from Åsgårdstrand
 Åsgårdstrand Portal (only in Norwegian)
Åsgårdstrand Velforening (only in Norwegian)

Former cities in Norway
Former municipalities of Norway
Villages in Vestfold og Telemark
Artist colonies
Norwegian artists groups and collectives